The 1987 Vuelta a España was the 42nd edition of the Vuelta a España, one of cycling's Grand Tours. The Vuelta began in Benidorm, with a prologue individual time trial on 23 April, and Stage 11 occurred on 4 May with a stage to the Lakes of Covadonga. The race finished in Madrid on 14 May.

Prologue
23 April 1987 — Benidorm to Benidorm,  (ITT)

Stage 1
24 April 1987 — Benidorm to Albacete,

Stage 2
25 April 1987 — Albacete to Valencia,

Stage 3
26 April 1987 — Valencia to Valencia,  (ITT)

Stage 4
27 April 1987 — Valencia to Villarreal,

Stage 5
28 April 1987 — Salou to Barcelona,

Stage 6
29 April 1987 — Barcelona to Grau Roig,

Stage 7
30 April 1987 — La Seu d'Urgell to Cerler,

Stage 8
1 May 1987 — Benasque to Zaragoza,

Stage 9
2 May 1987 — Zaragoza to Pamplona,

Stage 10
3 May 1987 — Miranda de Ebro to Alto Campoo,

Stage 11
4 May 1987 — Santander to Lakes of Covadonga,

References

1987 Vuelta a España
Vuelta a España stages